Chapman Glacier is a glacier at the head of Yule Bay in northern Victoria Land, Antarctica. The glacier was so named by the Australian National Antarctic Research Expeditions (ANARE) for A. Chapman, a member of the helicopter team in this vicinity during ANARE (Thala Dan), 1962, led by Phillip Law. The geographical feature lies situated on the Pennell Coast, a portion of Antarctica lying between Cape Williams and Cape Adare.

References
 

Glaciers of Pennell Coast